Only One is the debut Korean studio album by South Korean boy band U-KISS, it was released on February 3, 2010.  It features the lead single "Round and Round (Bingeul Bingeul)".

Background
Before prepareations for U-KISS' first full-length album, Only One was finalized, "Without You" was the planned lead single.  However, on February 3, 2010, "Bingeul Bingeul" (original title: 빙글빙글; literal meaning Round and Round) was announced as the lead single. The song was released via digital download on February 2 of the same year.

After various performances in South Korea, Universal Records released the album in the Philippines on March 28. 2010. Premiere Entertainment Philippines (PEP Inc.) brought U-KISS to Manila for the first time to promote their album, and the group had three-day mall shows in the Philippines and appearances on GMA Network's Party Pilipinas and Walang Tulugan with the Master Showman. U-KISS set the record with the most number of albums sold in a mall event selling up to 5,000 copies of the album and earning an estimate of 1 million pesos.  Following this, U-KISS held their first major concert, entitled "First Kiss Tour in Manila', on June 14, 2010 at the Araneta Coliseum. The event was later released on DVD entitled U-KISS 1st Kiss Tour in Manila DVD.

The album Only One reached number 2 on Gaon's Weekly Digital Charts and placed at number 71 on the 2010 Year-End Charts.  On February 29, 2012 a Japanese version of "Bingeul Bingeul" was released as a part of U-KISS's first Japanese album, A Shared Dream.

Track listing

Chart performance

Album chart

Sales

References

2010 albums
U-KISS albums
Genie Music albums
Korean-language albums